CISD may refer to:
Canadian Industrial Security Directorate
Consolidated Independent School District, a term used in Texas for school districts for merged districts
Colonel's Island Railroad
Configuration interaction singles & doubles, a variational quantum-chemical method for calculating electronic states
Critical Incident Stress Debriefing